The 2014 Missouri Valley Conference baseball tournament was held from May 20 through 24.  All eight teams participated in the double-elimination tournament held at Indiana State's Bob Warn Field at Sycamore Stadium in Terre Haute, Indiana.  Dallas Baptist won the tournament for the first time, earning the conference's automatic bid to the 2014 NCAA Division I baseball tournament.

Seeding and format
The league's eight teams were seeded based on conference winning percentage.  The teams played a two bracket, double-elimination format tournament, with the winner of each bracket then playing a single-elimination final.

Results

All-Tournament Team
The following players were named to the All-Tournament Team. Dallas Baptist shortstop Camden Duzenack, one of four Patriots selected, was named Most Outstanding Player.

References

Tournament
Missouri Valley Conference Baseball Tournament
Missouri Valley Conference baseball tournament
Missouri Valley Conference baseball tournament